Anthrenus ceylonicus, is a species of skin beetle found in Sri Lanka.

Description
Body length is about 2.15 to 2.7 mm. Body strongly convex, oval, and covered  with scales. Eyes are big and convex. Frons possess pseudoocelli, which are covered with light brown scales. Antenna light brown in color, with 10-segments. Antennae covered with dense light-brown pubescence. Elytra clothed with creamy grey scales. The three transverse fasciae in elytra are divided to spots. Dorsal and ventral surface of integument are dark brown. Both dorsum and ventrum are slightly punctuated, and covered with grey and light brown scales. Pronotum clothed with light brown and creamy grey scales. Elytra covered with creamy grey and light brown scales in a pattern. On th dorsal surface of ventrum, light brownish scales are interspersed with creamy grey small patches. Legs brown, and dorsally covered with grey scales. In male genitalia, aedeagus wide posteriorly, with curved apex. Parameres are broad with few short setae.

References 

Dermestidae
Insects of Sri Lanka
Insects described in 2006